Open Sesame is the fourth studio album by American hip hop group Whodini. It was released on August 27, 1987 via Jive Records, the final album of new material the group would release on the label before moving to MCA Records. Audio production was handled almost entirely by Larry Smith, except for two tracks both produced by Sinister and Whodini. The record peaked at #30 on the Billboard 200, at #8 on the Top R&B/Hip-Hop Albums, and was certified gold by the Recording Industry Association of America on January 20, 1988.

The album spawned the single "Be Yourself" featuring Millie Jackson, which peaked at #20 on the Hot R&B/Hip-Hop Songs.

Track listing 

Samples
Track 1 contains elements from "Long Red" by Mountain (1972)
Track 2 contains elements from "Impeach the President" by The Honey Drippers (1973), "The Payback" by James Brown (1973), "Get Up, Get Into It, Get Involved" by James Brown (1970), "Say What?" by Trouble Funk (1983)
Track 7 contains elements from "Dance to the Drummer's Beat" by Herman Kelly & Life (1978)

Personnel
Jalil Hutchins - performer, producer (tracks: 2, 9)
John "Ecstacy" Fletcher - performer, producer (tracks: 2, 9)
Mildred Jackson - performer (track 2)
Lawrence Michael Smith - producer (tracks: 1, 3-8, 10-12)
Sinister - producer (tracks: 2, 9)
Roy Cormier - co-producer (tracks: 2, 9)
Bryan "Chuck" New - mixing (tracks: 1, 3-8, 10-12)
Rod Hui - mixing (tracks: 2, 9)
Douglas Rowell - photography
Maude Gilman - art direction

Certifications

References

External links 

1987 albums
Whodini albums
Jive Records albums
Albums produced by Larry Smith (producer)